Budennovsky is a rural locality (a khutor) in Krasnokorotkovskoye Rural Settlement, Novoanninsky District, Volgograd Oblast, Russia. The population was 29 as of 2010.

Geography 
Budennovsky is located in steppe on the Khopyorsko-Buzulukskaya Plain, on the bank of the Podpeshnoye Lake, 7 km north of Novoanninsky (the district's administrative centre) by road. Krasnokorotkovsky is the nearest rural locality.

References 

Rural localities in Novoanninsky District